Global Underground 004: Paul Oakenfold, Live in Oslo is a double mix CD in the Global Underground series, compiled and mixed by Paul Oakenfold. The mix was recorded live at Cosmopolite Club in Oslo, Norway, as part of the official launch of the Quart Festival. It showcases Paul Oakenfold's eclectic taste in music at the time, as the mix combines drum and bass, progressive house & trance, trance, and goa trance.

The CD was released on Boxed Records with the catalogue number GU004CD (GU004CDX for the limited edition transparent PVC case) in 1997.

Track listing

Disc one
"Artemis" - "Elysian Fields" – 8:33
"Omni Trio" - "Tripping on Broken Beats (Carlito Mix)" – 5:20
"JMJ & Richie" - "Beyond Therapy" – 3:52
"Alaska" - "Alaska" – 3:27
"Jamie Myerson" - "Music for the Lonely" – 4:51
"Olive" - "You're Not Alone (Perfecto Mix)" – 2:52
"LTJ Bukem"" - "Music" (Peshay Rework) – 5:35
"Bedrock" - "Set in Stone" – 10:34
"Lil Mo Ying Yang" - "Reach (Basement Jaxx Firecracker Mix)" – 5:30
"K"-Lab - "In The Lab" – 5:44
"Disco Droids" - "Interspace (Original Tremolo Mix)" – 6:42
"Chapel of Rest" - "Last Prayer" – 7:28

Disc two
 Bedrock - "Forbidden Zone" – 8:32
 Cruzeman - "Ohm Sessions" – 8:38
 Atlantic Ocean - "Cycles of Life" – 3:52
 Taucher - "Waters" – 5:33
 Shades of Blue - "So Much" – 9:05
 The Freak & Mac Zimms - "Submission" – 4:59
 Astral Projection - "Ionised" – 6:37
 Eve - "Trance in Saigon" – 6:24
 Joking Sphinx - "Course Poursuite" – 5:04
 Eve - "Rhapsody in Venice" – 7:24

References

External links 

Global Underground
Paul Oakenfold remix albums
1997 remix albums
1997 compilation albums
Paul Oakenfold compilation albums